Children of Earth is the banner title of the third and penultimate series of the British television science fiction programme Torchwood, which broadcast for five episodes on BBC One from 6 to 10 July 2009. The series had new producer Peter Bennett and was directed by Euros Lyn, who had considerable experience on the revived Doctor Who, Torchwood's parent show. Torchwood is a series about an organization known as Torchwood which defends the Earth against alien threats. The plot of Children of Earth deals with aliens demanding the Earth's children, and a related earlier conspiracy 40 years ago; as such, Torchwood is pitted against the British government when the government attempts to conceal its past actions and concede to the present-day aliens' demands. The first, third, and fifth episodes of the serial were written by executive producer Russell T Davies, who also conceived its overall storyline. The third episode was co-written by James Moran whilst the second and fourth were penned by newcomer John Fay.

Torchwood was shown on the network's premiere channel, BBC One, every weeknight for one week in July 2009. Despite the move to BBC One, the show was cut from a standard thirteen-episode run to just five, something that lead actor John Barrowman felt was almost like a "punishment" from the BBC. Production on the mini-series began in August 2008, and Barrowman along with actors Eve Myles, Gareth David Lloyd and Kai Owen all returned. The serial significantly features new actors to the series over the course of its five episodes, including Peter Capaldi. Davies had to substantially rewrite parts of the serial to accommodate the unavailability of actors Freema Agyeman and Noel Clarke, whose presence in the serial had been set up in the 2008 Doctor Who finale.

When the series defied expectations by achieving good ratings (peaking at 6.76 million), Davies stated that a surprised BBC Controller rang to congratulate him. Mid-summer evenings are typically considered a graveyard slot for television series. The serial also received acclaim, particularly in comparison to the programme's previous two series, as well as a BAFTA Cymru Award, a Saturn Award and Celtic Media Festival Award, all for best serial. The success of the series led to a fourth series, Torchwood: Miracle Day, which was commissioned in conjunction with the US premium cable network Starz.

Plot 
In 1965 Scotland, an alien race called the 456 offer the British government a cure to an influenza strain that would wipe out 25 million people, in exchange for 12 children. One of these children, Clement McDonald, is pubescent and no longer produces the chemical the 456 uses recreationally. Clement escapes and is institutionalised for over 40 years.

Over the course of two days in the present, all the children in the world, along with Clement, are paralysed in place and speak several messages in unison announcing the 456's return on the third day. To cover up Jack's involvement in the events of 1965, civil servant John Frobisher orders a black-ops kill squad to assassinate him. To this end, Agent Johnson plants a bomb in Jack's abdomen, which detonates inside the Torchwood Hub in Cardiff, destroying it, though Jack survives due to his immortality.

On the third day, the ambassador for the 456 arrives in Thames House. Frobisher and his staff, including his personal assistant Lois Habiba, who wears special contact lenses given to her by Torchwood to record what she sees, hold confidential meetings with the 456 to understand why they have returned. The 456 demand that 10% of the world's children are handed over to them, or else they will destroy the human race. The governments of the world comply, and Lois records the British government's agreement.

Torchwood threaten to have Gwen's husband Rhys leak the government's agreement to the world. Jack and Ianto storm Thames House, confront the 456 and warn them humanity will fight back. In response, the 456 release a lethal virus. Thames House automatically locks down, and Ianto is killed along with many others. At the same time, the 456 kill Clement with an auditory signal.

The government choose to use the schools at the bottom of the league tables  to give to the 456. To convince the public of the cover story of an inoculation programme against the paralysing effect, Prime Minister Brian Green orders Frobisher to submit his own children to them. Frobisher agrees, returns home and kills his two daughters to spare them this fate. He then kills his wife and himself. When some parents keep their children home from school, the military tries to secure the remaining children. Jack uses the same audio signal that was used to kill Clement against the 456, by using his grandson Steven Carter as a focal point. The 456 suffer in pain before withdrawing from the Earth, and Steven is killed.

Green suggests that they cover up the tragedy and place the blame on the United States, but Bridget Spears, Lois's superior, reveals that she has recorded this conversation on the contact lenses and will release it, ending Green's political career. After six months of travelling Earth, Jack decides to leave for space to start a new life.

Episodes

Production

Locations 
Filming for the series started in Cardiff in August 2008, with a week's filming taking place in London. Additional filming took place in the Maindee area of Newport for the pub scene, and on the set of BBC's Casualty in Bristol, which doubled as the fictional St. Helen's Hospital in Cardiff. The set for Floor 13 was the largest ever built at Upper Boat Studios. However, many of the scenes set in the corridors of the same building (supposedly Thames House in London) were shot in the corridors of the Guildhall, Swansea.

Casting 
John Barrowman, Eve Myles, Gareth David Lloyd, Kai Owen and Tom Price all reprise their respective Torchwood roles for the serial. David-Lloyd had first concluded that Ianto was being killed off when his agent told him he was only needed for four out of five episodes.

Peter Capaldi and Nick Briggs had both previously been involved in Doctor Who productions prior to Children of Earth. Capaldi, who portrays Home Office Permanent Secretary John Frobisher, previously played Lobus Caecilius in the Doctor Who episode "The Fires of Pompeii", and would return to Doctor Who in 2013 to play the Twelfth Doctor. Briggs, the voice actor who provides voices for several creatures in the revived series of Doctor Who, including the Daleks, appears as Rick Yates, a member of Brian Green's Cabinet. He had also previously played many roles in the Big Finish range of officially licensed audio dramas. Having been set up to do so by the conclusion of their storylines in "Journey's End", Doctor Who alumni Freema Agyeman and Noel Clarke were due to reprise their roles as Martha Jones and Mickey Smith respectively, but were unable to participate due to "scheduling issues". Davies explained that Agyeman was cast in Law & Order: UK before Children of Earth had been officially commissioned. Because Law & Order offered her thirteen episodes a year, she went with that over Torchwood which had been reduced to five. In response, Davies introduced the character of Lois Habiba, played by Cush Jumbo, to be a "kind of a Martha figure", one with added innocence who is out of her depth. Agyeman didn't rule out returning to the show at a later date, however, and Davies also expressed interest in her returning to the role. Jack and Gwen explain Martha's absence by saying that she is on her honeymoon, and the Doctor Who serial "The End of Time" reveals that she married Mickey rather than her previous fiancé Thomas Milligan (Tom Ellis).

Children of Earth featured a largely new supporting cast for the duration of the five-episode serial. Further new characters included Clem McDonald (Paul Copley), senior Home Office official Bridget Spears (Susan Brown), Prime Minister Brian Green (Nicholas Farrell), and ruthless operative Agent Johnson (Liz May Brice). Katy Wix and Rhodri Lewis play Rhiannon and Johnny Davies, Ianto's sister and brother-in-law respectively. Lucy Cohu plays Captain Jack Harkness's daughter Alice. The voice of the 456 was provided by actor and voiceover artist Simon Poland.

Preview 
A preview of Children of Earth was screened at the National Film Theatre on 12 June 2009.

Broadcast 
Children of Earth was first broadcast on BBC One over five nights from 6 to 10 July 2009. It was the programme's first transmission on BBC One, after its first series debuted on BBC Three in 2006 and its second series moved to BBC Two in 2008.

Internationally, it was broadcast in Australia from 7 July 2009 on UKTV Australia, and was shown from 20 July 2009 on Space in Canada and BBC America in the U.S. (the air date was set to coincide with the launch of BBC America's HD simulcast).

Soundtrack 

Silva Screen released the soundtrack via MP3 on 10 July, and CD on 27 July. The CD features 40 tracks, 38 tracks divided between the five 'days' of the programme, the other two being the opening and closing theme.

DVD release 
The Region 2 DVD release was released on 13 July 2009, followed by the Region 1 release on both DVD and Blu-ray on 28 July 2009.  The Best Buy limited edition included the CD for the audio drama Lost Souls.  Music for the fifth episode differed from the original broadcast version. The Region 4 DVD release became available on 1 October 2009.

Reception

Reviews
The series was met with critical acclaim. Metacritic, an American review aggregator website, gives Children of Earth a normalised rating of 80 out of 100 (based on a sample of 12 reviews), indicating "generally favourable reviews", with the highest score being a 91 from Time and the lowest a 60 from The New York Times.

Daniel Martin ran a day-by-day review of the show on The Guardian website guardian.co.uk which culminated in a positive assessment of the mini-series as a whole: " ... what an incredible week. From its hideous Sex Alien vs Cyberwoman beginnings, Torchwood has become a true treasure." He speculated on the programme's thematic implication that "as people realise their potential in this world, they die", and remarked: "If the same thing does happen to the series it would be awful. But God, it would be poetic."

Ben Rawson-Jones of Digital Spy gave a very favourable pre-review to the first three episodes of the serial. He particularly praised Davies' script for its "economical" and "seamless" re-establishment of the show's returning trio for new viewers whilst not alienating fans. The inter-weaving of the stories for "credible and appealing" supporting characters Rupesh, Clement and Lois was praised; as were the performances from Paul Copley and Liz May Brice. He did however feel that the second episode paled after the explosiveness of the first episode, on which they "failed to capitalise". Summing up the series, Rawson-Jones described Children of Earth as "a powerful human drama, reliant not on special effects but incredible acting, direction and writing" that was a "massive success."

IGN writer Ahsan Haque gave the miniseries a rating of 9.5 out of 10, also awarding it their Editor's Choice Award. John Barrowman's performance was highly praised, saying that he handled "these gut-wrenching moments with poise, yet manages to give us just enough to know how much his choices are tearing him up inside. He might not be able to die physically, but emotionally, what Jack has to suffer and live with is a fate far worse than death." Also, Haque felt that the additions of Rhiannon and Johnny "supply a lot of the grounded humanizing moments that really help the story stay grounded to the human condition, and not turn into a mindless sci-fi action-fest." However, Haque pointed out the "slightly campy feel" as well as technobabble as faults. The review ended with: "Best. Torchwood. Ever. Really, we mean it!"

Mike Hale of The New York Times was more mixed in his review, noting that the mini-series pays tribute to the 1960 British sci-fi film Village of the Damned, and sums up by saying "Children of Earth is still good fun, if not good, exactly." Hale also mentioned the problem with maintaining a 5-hour mini-series over 5 nights, a sentiment echoed by Los Angeles Times reviewer Robert Lloyd who felt that the format led to an inevitable lag in the middle.

Not all reviews were positive. Jim Shelley of The Daily Mirror gave the mini-series an unfavourable review, commenting that "Torchwood is the modern-day Blake's 7: ludicrous plot, hammy acting, an adolescent penchant for 'Issues'. This week's plot was plagiarised from 50s sci-fi classic, The Midwich Cuckoos. Contrary to its scheduling, Torchwood always seems to me like Dr Who lite." He went on to say that he felt a large part of the problem was with lead actor John Barrowman: "Unlike David Tennant's Doctor, Barrowman's endless appearances on friendly drivel like Tonight's the Night, The Kids Are All Right and Any Dream Will Do, is so over-exposed, 'Captain Jack' is about as intriguing or alien as a Weetabix and twice as irritating. Unlike Tennant, as an actor he is just not good enough."

Fan reaction

The death of Ianto Jones in Children of Earth triggered protests from fans of the show, including the "Save Ianto Jones" campaign, which collected more than £10,000 for the Children in Need charity. Other fans resorted to abuse and threats, causing writer James Moran to fire off an angry missive in a blog post. Showrunner Russell T Davies made no apologies for the decision to kill off the character, saying, "I'm just delighted that the fans are so wrapped up in the character to have that reaction." Writer John Fay, in executing Davies' vision, noted that Ianto's death was a means for the viewer to see the price of Jack's immortality and seeing those he cares for die around him. Ianto's death led several fans to accuse the show's creators of subscribing to homophobic narrative conventions. AfterElton, one of the websites critical of the decision, later published an opposing view that analysed the death in view of the character's earlier refusal to admit to his relationship, and claimed that, instead of being an expression of homophobia, the death was a sign that the LGBT community was leaving behind its image of victimhood.

Awards
In 2010, Children of Earth won the BAFTA Cymru award for best drama series, a Saturn Award for Best Television Presentation during the 36th Saturn Awards and a 2010 Celtic Media Festival Award for best drama series. It was also nominated for a GLAAD Media Award by the Gay & Lesbian Alliance Against Defamation for Outstanding TV Movie or Mini-Series during the 21st GLAAD Media Awards and for a Television Critics Association Award for Outstanding Achievement in Movies, Miniseries and Specials. Lead actress Eve Myles won the 'Best Actress" award in the SFX Reader's awards poll, and was crowned best actress in the 11th annual Airlock Alpha Portal Awards. Myles was also nominated for a 2010 BAFTA Cymru Best Actress award, whilst John Barrowman made the shortlist of the 2010 TV Choice Awards, where he was up against Eleventh Doctor actor Matt Smith.

References

External links 

Torchwood: Children of Earth
Torchwood
Torchwood: Children of Earth
Torchwood: Children of Earth
Torchwood: Children of Earth
Torchwood: Children of Earth
Torchwood: Children of Earth
Torchwood: Children of Earth